The Malta-class aircraft carrier was a British large aircraft carrier design of World War II. Four ships were ordered in 1943 for the Royal Navy, but changing tactical concepts, based on American experience in the Pacific War, caused repeated changes to the design, which was not completed before the end of the war. All four ships were cancelled in 1945 before they were laid down.

Background 
In July 1942 the Royal Navy formed the Future Building Committee, chaired by the Deputy First Sea Lord, to examine the fleet's requirements for the rest of the war. Tasked with anticipating the Navy's readiness and requirements for January 1944, the committee realised that a major expansion of naval aviation was required, which meant that more aircraft carriers would be needed. Many factors combined to drive up the size of these new carriers, notably the increasing size and speed of aircraft and the desire to increase the numbers of aircraft aboard fleet carriers. Another important consideration was the change in carrier tactics from the earlier doctrine of more attacks with smaller numbers of aircraft to the use of large, single airstrikes.

Sir Stanley V. Goodall, Director of Naval Construction (DNC), proposed a variety of designs, both open and closed hangar. On 8 October 1943, the Board of Admiralty selected a closed-hangar design with an armoured flight deck and five propeller shafts. Reports of American operations in the Pacific convinced the Board to reconsider hangar design; American experience had shown that the ability to fly off all of a carrier's aircraft in a single airstrike was vital. That required a well-ventilated, open-hangar design, which would reduce the time required to launch the aircraft by allowing them to begin the typical 15-minute engine warm-up while still in the hangar. On 15 May 1944, the Board reversed itself and ordered the DNC to produce an open-hangar design with deck-edge lifts. An unarmoured flight deck was agreed upon in June by the Controller of the Navy and the Fifth Sea Lord.

In October, concerns arose over the size of Design X in that it might have problems manoeuvring in constricted harbours, and the DNC was asked for two smaller designs: X1,  shorter, and Y,  shorter. Design Y was too short for efficient operations with the larger aircraft the committee anticipated, and the First Sea Lord selected X1. It was submitted to the Board on 12 April 1945 and fully worked out in anticipation of approval that never came. The Board minutes for 31 August noted that further consideration of the design had been postponed.

Description 
Their complement was expected to consist of 3,520 officers and enlisted men.

Because the unarmoured flight deck required an expansion joint about amidships, the Maltas' island could not be a single structure and was split into two, each section with its own funnel. This allowed turbulence around the islands to be reduced and provided more space for radars and fire-control directors. They would have been backed up by three crash barricades to prevent landing aircraft from crashing into aircraft parked on the ship's bow. The ships were designed with four  lifts (two on the centreline (and two on the portside deck edge to facilitate the rapid movement of aircraft between the flight deck and the hangar. In case of fire the hangar was intended to be divided by four sliding steel doors. Between the hangar spaces and the deck park, the Malta class would have been capable of accommodating between 80 and 108 aircraft.

Propulsion 
The ships would have used four Parsons double-reduction geared steam turbines, each driving one shaft, using steam supplied by eight Admiralty 3-drum boilers. The boilers were distributed between four boiler compartments, but all four turbines were in a single compartment, well aft.

Armament 
The ships' main armament was intended to be sixteen  QF 4.5-in (113 mm) Mark VII  dual-purpose guns in eight powered RP 41 Mk VII twin-gun turrets, four on each side of the hull. The light anti-aircraft (AA) armament would have consisted of 55 40 mm Bofors AA guns in eight sextuple stabilised, powered RP 50 Mk VI mounts and seven single mounts of an unknown type.

Electronics 
An August 1944 study anticipated that the ships would carry four early warning radars, including height-finders, four surface search radars and eight gunnery/fire-control radars. Historian David Hobbs wrote that they would mount Type 960 early warning, Type 982 intercept, Type 983 height-finding and Type 293M target indication radars. In addition a number of gunnery radars would also be needed.

Protection 
The waterline armour belt was also four inches thick, but covered only the central portion of the ship to form the armoured citadel. The belt was closed by  transverse bulkheads fore and aft.  of armour extended  forward and  aft of the belt to protect the waterline against splinter damage.

An earlier version, however, had been estimated to be able to resist a  charge, but failed against a  charge in a full-scale test.

The magazines for the 4.5-inch guns and the steering gear both lay outside the armoured citadel and had their own armour. The magazines had four-inch roofs and sides, with three-inch ends while the steering gear also had a four-inch roof, but only three-inch sides and ends.

Ordering and cancellation
Well before the design was finalised, four ships were ordered in July 1943. Africa was originally ordered as an unnamed Audacious-class carrier, but the order was modified to a Malta-class ship on 12 July 1943. Malta, New Zealand and Gibraltar were all ordered three days later. New Zealand was originally ordered from Cammell Laird, but the contract was transferred to Harland and Wolff on 22 July 1944. The Admiralty ordered Vickers not to order any more material on 27 April 1944 and given that final drawings were never issued to the builders, it is unlikely that any of them actually did more than preliminary work. None of the ships were ever laid down and all of them were cancelled before the end of 1945.

Ships

Notes

Footnotes

References

External links
 Hazegray.org

Aircraft carrier classes
Aircraft carriers of the Royal Navy
Abandoned military projects of the United Kingdom
Cancelled aircraft carriers
Proposed ships of the Royal Navy
Ship classes of the Royal Navy